This is a list of the combined career statistics of the Big Four, the four players who have dominated men's tennis in singles for the majority of the first quarter of the 21st century. The Big Four consists of Roger Federer, Rafael Nadal, Novak Djokovic, and Andy Murray.

Overall dominance

Since the 2005 Australian Open the Big Four have won three of four Olympic Games singles tournaments, all but nine majors and all but seven ATP Finals championships. Since the 2003 Wimbledon Championships, the Big Four have won a combined 67 Grand Slam singles titles.

The dominance does not just consist of winning the events, with all four members regularly making it to the latter stages of tournaments. Out of 72 majors between the 2005 Australian Open and 2022 Australian Open, the only three finals not to include any member of the Big Four were those of 2005 Australian Open, 2014 and 2020 US Opens. They occupied ten consecutive major finals (winner and runner-up) from the 2010 US Open to the 2013 Australian Open. Since 2008, they have occupied all four semi-final spots on four occasions, at the 2008 US Open, 2011 French Open, 2011 US Open and 2012 Australian Open, as well as taking three of the four spaces on nine other separate occasions. In 2011, they occupied 14 out of a possible 16 Grand Slam semi-final slots. In the same period, only twice did two or more not made the semi-final stage (2009 and 2010 French Open), while in 2012 they took 13 out 16 Grand Slam semi-final slots. At the Olympics, members of the Big Four took five of the nine available singles medals in 2008, 2012 and 2016, and also including doubles have a total of five golds, two silvers and a bronze from these Games. Murray has three Olympic medals, whilst Nadal and Federer have won two Olympic medals each. Murray is the only of them to have won two medals at the same tournament, taking both the singles gold and mixed doubles silver medals at the 2012 Summer Olympics. He is also the only player of either gender to have won two gold medals in the singles event. Djokovic is the only member not to have won a gold medal in any event so far, although he did win the singles bronze medal in 2008. Federer is the only member to have won Hopman Cup for his nation, winning thrice in 2001, 2018, and 2019.

The Big Four, along with Rod Laver, Tony Roche and Ivan Lendl, are the only men in Open Era history to reach the semi-finals at all four Majors in a single calendar year. Federer and Djokovic have achieved this a record five times in their career so far. Similarly, the Big Four make up four of the seven players (along with Andre Agassi, Ken Rosewall and Ivan Lendl) to have made the semi-finals three or more times at each of the four Majors. Additionally, the Big Four make up four of the ten players to have reached the final at each of the four Majors. Finally, prior to 2009, no man had made 20 Grand Slam singles finals, with Ivan Lendl leading the way with 19. However, since then, Djokovic (33), Federer (31), and Nadal (30) have each surpassed this mark.

Combined Grand Slam tournament performance timeline (best result)

Big Four Head-to-Head Grand Slam finals: 33

Combined ATP Finals performance timeline (best result)

Big Four ATP Finals finals: 6

Combined Olympic Games singles performance timeline (best result)

Big Four Olympic finals

ATP Masters tournaments
Similarly, ATP Masters events have been dominated by the Big Four. Djokovic leads with 38 titles, ahead of Nadal (36), Federer (28) and Murray (14). They have won a combined 116 titles. Between the 2005 Indian Wells Masters and 2017 Madrid Masters they collectively won 96 out of 112 events (85%), however their most dominant period was from the 2011 Indian Wells Masters to the 2017 Madrid Masters where they won 54 out of 58 (93%). This includes all 9 in 2011, 2013 and 2015. Moreover, from the 2014 Cincinnati Masters to the 2016 Canada Masters, they won 18 consecutive ATP Masters events. From the beginning of 2013 through the first six events of 2017, they had a streak of 42 consecutive Masters events where at least one of the four reached the final, winning a combined 37 titles. Strangely, only three times (2009, 2011 & 2012) did all four win at least one event during the same calendar year. Since 2003 no other player has won more than 3 titles. Nadal (406), Djokovic (385) and Federer (381) have won more matches than any other player (Jimmy Connors is a distant fourth with 261). Murray (225) stands seventh.

Combined Masters performance timeline (best result)

Big Four ATP Masters finals: 48
The four have met one another at least twice in Masters finals. Their head-to-head records are: Federer 5–7 Nadal; Federer 3–5 Djokovic; Federer 0-2 Murray; Nadal 7–7 Djokovic; Nadal 1–1 Murray; Djokovic 5–5 Murray.

From 2009 until 2021, the Big Four (Roger Federer, Rafael Nadal, Novak Djokovic, and Andy Murray) have combined to win 83 of 110 ATP Masters finals. Djokovic won 33 titles, Nadal won 24 titles, Federer won 14, and Murray 12 titles. The remaining 27 titles were won by 20 different players, with only Alexander Zverev and Daniil Medvedev winning multiple titles during that period of time, five and four titles respectively.

Only thirteen players outside the Big Four have reached three or more Masters finals during 2009–2021. David Ferrer made it to seven finals between 2010 and 2015, winning a title at the 2012 Paris Masters. John Isner has made it to five finals between 2012–2019 and won the 2018 Miami Open title. Tomáš Berdych made 3 finals from 2010 to 2015, and had also previously won the 2005 Paris title. Juan Martín del Potro reached four finals between 2009–2018 and won the 2018 Indian Wells title. Kei Nishikori and Milos Raonic have also made it to four finals but won none. Dominic Thiem has made it to three finals and won the 2019 Indian Wells title. Jo-Wilfried Tsonga made three finals during this period and won the 2014 Canada title (2008 Paris was Tsonga's first Masters title). Stan Wawrinka made it to three finals and won the 2014 Monte Carlo title. Stefanos Tsitsipas made it to three finals and won the 2021 Monte-Carlo title. Gaël Monfils made it to three finals but won none. Between 2017 and 2021, Alexander Zverev made it to nine finals and won five titles, while Daniil Medvedev made it to six finals and won four titles.

Of the eleven remaining players that won a Masters title between 2009 and 2021, only Andy Roddick (2010 Miami Open) made it to two finals. Mardy Fish and Andrey Rublev also made it to two finals but won zero titles.

Only on nine occasions during 2009–2021 has a player outside of the Big Four won a title by beating a member of the Big Four in the final:
 Nikolay Davydenko defeated Nadal (2009 Shanghai).
 Stan Wawrinka (2014 Monte Carlo), Jo-Wilfried Tsonga (2014 Toronto), Juan Martín del Potro (2018 Indian Wells), and Dominic Thiem (2019 Indian Wells) defeated Federer.
 Marin Čilić defeated Murray (2016 Cincinnati).
 Alexander Zverev defeated Djokovic (2017 Rome), and Federer (2017 Montreal).
 Karen Khachanov defeated Djokovic (2018 Paris).

The Big Four had a streak of 42 consecutive finals appearances (from 2013 Indian Wells to 2017 Canada). They won 18 consecutive titles from the 2014 Cincinnati to the 2016 Canada event. Nadal and Djokovic together held all 9 Masters singles titles starting with the 2013 Monte-Carlo tournament through the 2014 Miami event.

Big Four finals in ATP 500 & ATP 250: 15

Top-level tournament records

The four Grand Slams, the ATP Finals, the ATP Masters and the Summer Olympics, make up the 15 most coveted tournaments in men's tennis. Although no player has won each of these 15 events in men's singles, Djokovic is the closest to achieve all 15 tournaments, missing only the Olympic title. Murray is only the second player in the Open Era after Agassi to have won a Major, Masters title, Tour Finals, Davis Cup and Olympic Gold.

Federer and Nadal are two behind Djokovic. Nadal has also achieved a Career Grand Slam and a Career Golden Slam, but has thus far fallen short of winning the Tour Finals, the Miami Open and Paris Masters. Federer has also achieved a Career Grand Slam, but is missing the Olympic Gold in singles, the Monte-Carlo Masters and Italian Open. Murray has won 11 of the 15 events.

Federer and Nadal have reached the final of each of the 15 elite tournaments. Djokovic has reached the final of all of them except the Olympics. Murray has yet to play in the final at Monte Carlo.

Current through the 2022 Paris Masters .

Open-era record underlined.
¤ Denotes titles were won in different tournaments.

Rivalries

The respective rivalries between the Big Four are considered to be some of the greatest of all time. Amongst the four of them they have played 232 matches against each other, 65 of which were at Grand Slam events. This includes 33 Grand Slam tournament finals, as well as 26 Grand Slam semi-final meetings, more than any other group of four players. Currently, Djokovic leads the head-to-head record against all members of the Big Four. Djokovic has also won 20+ matches against all three of his peers, while Nadal has won 20+ matches against two of his peers.  The Djokovic-Nadal and Djokovic-Federer rivalries are the only two in the Open Era to reach 50 matches. With five, Federer has recorded most bagels against all three of his peers, while receiving only one.

Head-to-head records

Big Four vs the rest of the field
The Big Four have collectively won 67 Major titles (Nadal and Djokovic winning a joint-record 22, Federer 20, and Murray 3). The only other active players who have a Major title to their name are Juan Martín del Potro (2009 US Open), Stan Wawrinka (2014 Australian Open, 2015 French Open, 2016 US Open), Marin Čilić (2014 US Open), Dominic Thiem (2020 US Open), Daniil Medvedev (2021 US Open), and Carlos Alcaraz (2022 US Open). Starting with the 2005 Wimbledon Championships, their combined record at Grand Slam tournaments against everyone else is 707–62. Moreover, only six times has a player outside the group beaten two of them in the same Grand Slam (Safin at the 2005 Australian Open, Tsonga at the 2008 Australian Open, del Potro at the 2009 US Open, Berdych at the 2010 Wimbledon Championships and Wawrinka at the 2014 Australian Open and the 2015 French Open). Stan Wawrinka, Jo-Wilfried Tsonga and Tomáš Berdych are the only players to have beaten each member of the Big Four at a Grand Slam event.

Wins over each member of the Big Four at a Grand Slam event
 Stan Wawrinka, 10 wins (defeated Murray at the 2010 and 2013 US Open and 2017 and 2020 French Open; Nadal at the 2014 Australian Open; Federer at the 2015 French Open; and Djokovic at the 2014 Australian Open, 2015 French Open and 2016 and 2019 US Open).  
 Tomáš Berdych, 6 wins (def. Murray at the 2010 French Open; Federer at the 2010 Wimbledon Championships and 2012 US Open; Djokovic at the 2010 and 2017 Wimbledon Championships; and Nadal at the 2015 Australian Open)
 Jo-Wilfried Tsonga, 5 wins (defeated Murray and Nadal at the 2008 Australian Open; Djokovic at the 2010 Australian Open; and Federer at the 2011 Wimbledon Championships and at the 2013 French Open)

Wins over three members of the Big Four at a Grand Slam event
 Fernando Verdasco, 4 wins (def. Djokovic at the 2005 US Open; Murray at the 2009 Australian Open and the 2018 US Open; and Nadal at the 2016 Australian Open)
 Andy Roddick, 3 wins (defeated Nadal at the 2004 US Open; Djokovic at the 2009 Australian Open; and Murray at the 2009 Wimbledon Championships)
 Marin Čilić, 3 wins (defeated Murray at the 2009 US Open; Federer at the 2014 US Open; and Nadal at the 2018 Australian Open)
Only four players have defeated 3 of the Big Four at the same tournament. Two of these players are members of the Big Four: Nadal who defeated Murray in the round of 16, Djokovic in the semi-finals, and Federer in the final to win the 2008 Hamburg Masters; and Federer who defeated Murray in the round robin round, Djokovic in the semi-finals, and Nadal in the finals to win the 2010 ATP World Tour Finals. The only two other players to have achieved this trifecta are:
 David Nalbandian (defeated Nadal in the quarter-finals, Djokovic in the semi-finals, and Federer in the finals to win the 2007 Madrid Masters)
 Jo-Wilfried Tsonga (defeated Djokovic in the round of 16, Murray in the quarter-finals, and Federer in the finals to win the 2014 Canada Masters)

Only three players have beaten a member of the Big Four in a major final. The first to do so was Juan Martín del Potro when he defeated Federer in the 2009 US Open final. Wawrinka defeated Nadal in the 2014 Australian Open final, and Djokovic in the 2015 Roland Garros final and the 2016 US Open final. Medvedev defeated Djokovic in the 2021 US Open final.  In all five cases, they defeated the world No. 1 in the process.

The Big Four have played in 100 tournaments where all four have competed. Collectively they have won 88 of these 100 tournaments (88%). Of the 12 tournaments they failed to win, they were runner-up in six of them, and five of these 12 tournaments occurred prior to them first being seeded as the top four players (post-US Open 2008). Since this time in 2008, the Big Four have won 59 of 66 tournaments (89%). And starting with the 2010 Rome Masters, they had won 31 consecutive tournaments where all four were present, until the 2014 Australian Open.

Only seven players have managed to win a tournament where all four of the Big Four have competed:

 Andy Roddick (2006 Cincinnati Masters, 2008 Dubai Tennis Championships, 2010 Miami Masters)
 David Nalbandian (2007 Madrid Masters, 2007 Paris Masters)
 Nikolay Davydenko (2008 Miami Masters, 2009 ATP World Tour Finals)
 Jo-Wilfried Tsonga (2008 Paris Masters)
 Juan Martín del Potro (2009 US Open)
 Ivan Ljubičić (2010 Indian Wells Masters)
 Stan Wawrinka (2014 Australian Open, 2015 French Open)

The Big Four's dominance ratio is also high when only three of the Big Four have competed in the same tournament. Of the 49 events where this has occurred, they have won 43 of them (88%). Since 2008, they have won 32 of 37 tournaments (86%).

Only 14 players have recorded at least one victory over each member of the Big Four. Of these players, eight have recorded ten or more victories in total, one has a positive record against two members (both are 2–1 win–loss records), and none have a positive record against all four combined.

Top-Level tournament records from 2005 Australian Open – 2023 Australian Open.

Grand Slam performances

Current as of 2023 Australian Open

Grand Slam tournament performance comparison

Before 2005, Murray and Djokovic had not competed in a Grand Slam tournament. Nadal had made four appearances during 2003 and 2004, reaching the third round at 2003 Wimbledon and 2004 Australian Open. Federer had been competing in Grand Slam tournaments since 1999, and had won Wimbledon in 2003 and 2004, as well as the 2004 Australian Open and 2004 US Open.

2003–2008

2009–2014

2015–2020

2021–2026

D indicates the player met Novak Djokovic at that tournament. 
F indicates the player met Roger Federer at that tournament. 
M indicates the player met Andy Murray at that tournament. 
N indicates the player met Rafael Nadal at that tournament.

Grand Slam tournament performance comparison by age
Note: age is at the end of the season

17–22

23–28

29–34

35–40

41– 

D indicates the player met Novak Djokovic at that tournament. 
F indicates the player met Roger Federer at that tournament. 
M indicates the player met Andy Murray at that tournament. 
N indicates the player met Rafael Nadal at that tournament.

Career finals performance comparison
Current through the 2023 Australian Open.

Boldface indicates an Open era record. Italics indicate a record since the reorganization of the ATP Tour in 1990.

Rankings

Between 8 September 2008 and 28 January 2013, the top four positions in the ATP rankings were occupied by all members of the Big Four for all but 16 weeks.  Roger Federer, Rafael Nadal, and Novak Djokovic were consistently in the top four for this period, with Andy Murray dropping to no. 5 during all 16 of those weeks.  The only two other players who entered the top four in this period were Juan Martín del Potro (3 weeks) and Robin Söderling (13 weeks). This run was ended when David Ferrer replaced Nadal in the top four following a period of injury for Nadal, and retained his place in the top four for much of 2013 as Roger Federer dropped down the rankings due to his own back injury problems.

All four have been world number one. Federer first reached number one in 2004 after winning his first Australian Open, whereas Nadal did in 2008 following his Olympics victory after three straight years of ending the year ranked world No. 2, behind Federer. Similarly, Djokovic achieved world No. 1 status following his Wimbledon victory in 2011, after four consecutive years at No. 3, in a season which is regarded as one of the greatest in the history of the sport. Murray reached the number one position after the Paris Masters on 7 November 2016, towards the end of a season in which he had made three Grand Slam tournament finals (winning one, Wimbledon), as well as winning the Olympic Games and three Masters tournaments.

They have held:
 The first two places in the ATP rankings continuously since 25 July 2005 (exclusively by Federer and Nadal from July 2005 to August 2009), and end on 14 March 2021 (total of 794 weeks) when Nadal moved from world number 2 to number 3. 
 The first three places in the ATP rankings continuously from 13 August 2007 to 7 July 2013.	
 The top four places in the ATP rankings for all but 16 weeks from 8 September 2008 to 28 January 2013.

Combined ATP Year-end ranking timeline (best result) 

Open-era record underlined.

ATP Year-end ranking timeline by year 
Note: rank is at the end of the season or when the player is last ranked in the season.

 On 23 September 2022, Federer retired from professional tennis at the 2022 Laver Cup. He played this last ATP event with protected ranking 9, however he was last ranked 97 at the starting week of 2022 Wimbledon in the ATP rankings.

ATP Year-end ranking timeline by age at end of season

Big Four ATP world No. 1 era 
Correct as of 7 November 2022.

Represents ATP rankings record.

Top 4 time spans 
Correct as of 7 November 2022.

Top 1 
Time span Big 4 held the top 1 ATP ranking position.

Top 2 
Time spans Big 4 held the top 2 ATP ranking positions. 

Spans per pair:

Top 3 
Time spans Big 4 held the top 3 ATP ranking positions.

Top 4 
Time spans Big 4 held the top 4 ATP ranking positions.

Weeks in Top 4 
Correct as of 14 November 2022.

 Most weeks at No. 1 record
 Most weeks at No. 2 record
 Most weeks at No. 3 record
 Most weeks at No. 4 record
 Most weeks in top 4 record

Career Grand Slam tournament 1st seedings

Djokovic has been seeded 1st in 31 Grand Slam tournaments, followed by Federer  (24), Nadal (16) and Murray (3).

 Nadal was seeded #1 but withdrew from the tournament after the draw was released.
 Seeded first ahead of Nadal despite their world rankings being reversed, this was due to Wimbledon's grass seedings formula.
 Djokovic was seeded #1 but withdrew from the tournament after the draw was released.
Bolded name indicates that the tournament was won by the top seed.

National and international representation
{{see also ITF team competitions: Olympics, Davis Cup, Hopman Cup and
ATP team competitions: Laver Cup, ATP Cup, United Cup}}

Current as of 2023 United Cup

Overall performance in all competitions

Performance comparison by events representation

Combined achievements

All four
 Represented in the final of 67 of the last 71 Grand Slam events (2005 Australian Open–2022 US Open).
 Won every Wimbledon from 2003 to 2022 (19 consecutive titles); furthermore 9 out of the 16 Wimbledon finals from 2006 to 2022 have been contested by two of the Big Four.
 8 of the 9 Australian Open finals from 2009 to 2017 (all except 2014) have been contested by two of the Big Four.
 33 Grand Slam tournament finals featured two from the Big Four, the most of any four players.
 Occupied at least 7 out of 8 Grand Slam finalist slots in 6 seasons (2007, 2008, 2011, 2012, 2013 and 2015), including all 20 from the 2010 US Open until the 2013 Australian Open.
 Occupied all four semi-final slots on 4 Grand Slam tournament occasions (2008 US Open, 2011 French Open, 2011 US Open and 2012 Australian Open).
 Along with Stefan Edberg, they are the only players to reach 5 or more Australian Open finals in the Open Era.
 Consecutively have held the world No. 1 ranking since February 2004 to February 2022.
 Occupied the world No. 1 and 2 rankings between 25 July 2005 and 14 March 2021.
 Won 96 of the 112 Masters tournaments from 2005 Indian Wells – 2017 Madrid.
 Won 18 consecutive Masters tournaments from the 2014 Cincinnati Open – 2016 Canadian Open.
 All 9 Masters tournaments won in 2011, 2013, and 2015.  
 Won every Grand Slam and Masters tournament as well as the ATP World Tour Finals in 2011 and 2013.
 Won 6+ of the 9 Masters tournaments for 12 consecutive years. (2005–2016)
 Occupied top four places in the rankings for 5 years, all consecutive. (2008–2012)
 The only four players to have reached the semi-finals or better at all nine ATP Masters series events at least once. 
 Were ranked in the year-end top 6 every year at age 21 through 29.
 Top four prize money leaders of all time.
 Consecutively have held the year-end No. 1 ranking since 2004 to 2021.

Three of the four

Djokovic, Federer and Nadal
 The top three players of all time in terms of Grand Slam titles won.
 The only three players in history to win 8+ titles at a single Grand Slam event.
 Represented in 66 of 71 Major finals from the 2005 Australian Open up to and including the 2022 US Open.
 Won 16 of the last 17 Australian Open titles since 2006 (represented in all 17 finals), as of 2022.
 Only three players in history to play 20 or more Major finals. Djokovic has reached 32 finals, Federer 31 and Nadal 30.
 Only three players in history to play 38 or more Major semi-finals.
 Only three players in the Open Era to have reached the final of every Grand Slam tournament at least five times.
 Only three players in the Open Era to have played 5 or more consecutive Grand Slam tournament finals.
 Consecutively held the world No. 1 ranking from February 2004 to November 2016 (almost 13 years), and also from August 2017 to the February 2022 (4 years).
 Occupied the top 3 places in the year-end rankings for 8 seasons, 5 consecutively (2007–2011, 2014, 2018–2019).
 The only era in men's tennis where three players have won double digit majors and the Career Grand Slam while playing in the same time period.
 Set or tied the Open Era record for most titles won in all four Grand Slam events – Djokovic with 9 Australian Open titles, Federer with 8 Wimbledon titles and 5 US Open titles (tied), and Nadal with 14 French Open titles.
 Only three players in tennis history to simultaneously hold Major titles on grass, hard court, and clay. Nadal achieved this feat from 2008 to 2009 and again in 2010, Federer in 2008–2009, and Djokovic from 2015 to 2016 and again from 2019 to 2021 (with no Wimbledon held in 2020).  
 All won ATP Player of the Year, ITF Men's Singles Champion, Laureus World Sports Award for Sportsman of the Year and ESPY Award for Best Male Tennis player. 
 Hold the all-time top 3 for match wins at the Australian Open and the French Open.
 Hold the Open Era top 3 for number of semifinals and quarterfinals reached at the French Open.
 Hold the top three for number of match wins against top 10 ranked opponents.
 Hold the top 11 spots for number of match wins against top 10 ranked opponents in a single season.
 Top three earliest to clinch year-end No. 1 leaders since the ATP rankings started in 1973.
 Held the Year-End Number 1 ranking for 12 consecutive years (2004–2015).
 All three have simultaneously appeared in 13 Major semifinals (Australian Open 2008, 2012; Roland Garros 2007, 2008, 2011, 2012, 2019; Wimbledon 2007, 2019; US Open 2008, 2009, 2010, 2011).

Djokovic, Murray and Nadal
 Won every Grand Slam tournament, Masters tournament and the ATP World Tour Finals in 2013.
 Won a combined 12 consecutive Rome Masters titles from 2005 to 2016. During this period Nadal has won 7, Djokovic 4 and Murray 1.

Djokovic, Federer and Murray
 Won every Masters tournament and ATP World Tour Finals in 2015.
 Won the ATP World Tour Finals at least once from 2010 to 2016, a record 7 consecutive titles. During this period Djokovic won 4, Federer won 2 and Murray won 1.

Main international tennis and sports awards

1Award shown in the year it honored, not the year it was presented.

Career evolution
This table lists end-of-season statistics for each member of the Big Four, allowing for comparison at the same age.
 = active record (updated Monday 30 January 2023).
Bold = age leader in completed years.

Titles by tournaments played comparison 
Another way to view their respective careers and evolution is to look at the progression of titles won by the number of tournaments played to win each of their titles at each level of competition including the four Majors, the nine ATP Masters, the ATP Finals (formerly Tennis Masters Cup), and the Olympic Games.

 Correct as of 2023 Australian Open.

See also

List of career achievements by Roger Federer
List of career achievements by Rafael Nadal
List of career achievements by Novak Djokovic
Open Era tennis records – men's singles
All-time tennis records - men's singles
List of Grand Slam men's singles champions
List of ATP number 1 ranked singles tennis players
ATP Ranking

Notes

References

Quartets

Roger Federer
Rafael Nadal
Novak Djokovic
Andy Murray